Frederick Augspurger Farm is a group of registered historic buildings near Trenton, Ohio, listed in the National Register on 1984-08-03. It consists of the house, the bank barn, the smokehouse, and the summer kitchen.

History 
The land for the property was purchased by Christian Augspurger from John Holly in 1847. The land went from his son, John Augspurger, to Frederick Augspurger in 1849. The house itself was built in 1865–1870, with two stories and a truncated hip roof. The farm was sold out of Mennonite hands by 1899, after the passing of Frederick Augspurger.

References

External links
Ohio Historic Inventory

Houses on the National Register of Historic Places in Ohio
National Register of Historic Places in Butler County, Ohio
Houses in Butler County, Ohio